The Great Salem fire of June 25, 1914, destroyed 1,376 buildings and made over 18,000 people homeless or jobless in Salem, Massachusetts, U.S.

It was among the last of the great industrial fires that plagued North American cities in the 19th century. Of the families it affected – burning homes or the breadwinner's workplace – 43% were Franco-American. Because so many people were left jobless after the city's largest employer burned down, the fire encouraged the creation of the United States Employment Service.

Before the fire

Franklin H. Wentworth agitated for more fire protection. In an article in the Salem Evening News (March 29, 1910, page 7), he called Salem, "in Danger of Destruction by Fire".
He felt that the main fire danger was to the downtown business district. 
The article included a map of all downtown buildings and their type of materials.

Mr. Wentworth, a Salem Councilman, introduced an order that would have required all new or replacement roof coverings to be non-combustible. He argued that this was as important as buying new engines or hiring new firemen. 
After a big fire, many of the working class would have to live in tents, he warned.

Wentworth was accused of serving only the interest of the insurance industry, and the amendment did not pass. Wentworth later became secretary of the National Board of Fire Underwriters.

Another failed attempt to increase safety in Salem was undertaken by Charles J. Collins.
The argument went that high-pressure pumps would pay for themselves with the reduction of insurance fees. Protecting the entire business and mercantile district would have cost US$150,000.

Building codes were dated, not mentioning standpipes, fire escapes, or sprinklers.

Salem had 180 fire alarm stations or boxes that could be used to contact telephone operators.
A long drought preceded the events of June 25, 1914.

The fire
The Great Salem Fire started with a series of explosions, caused by a mixture of acetone, amalacitate, alcohol, and celluloid. 
At 1:37 p.m. (EDT) on June 25, 1914, a fire alarm box was used to report a fire in the Korn Leather Factory at 57 Boston Street. A memorial plaque is on the site, now occupied by a Walgreens store.

The fire spread quickly down and across Boston Street, due to a drought. The police department sent out calls to 21 cities for assistance. One industrial department, the Fore River Shipyard, also assisted. Over 90 out of town policemen came to help. The Salem Evening News, (Friday, July 24, 1914, page 11), had a complete list of all responding departments and where and how they worked to fight the fire.

The Salem Evening News covered the events in a series of articles, which were later reprinted as a book by Montanye Perry.

Aftermath
The fire burned  of land with 1,376 buildings. The entire loss was estimated at US$15 million; insurance policies paid US$11.744 million. Some 20,000 people lost their homes, 10,000 their jobs, and a few their lives.

Chestnut Street, designed by architect Samuel McIntire, survived the fire, as well as what is now City Hall, the oldest continually run city hall in America, open since 1837. The McIntire Historic District is the largest area of homes in America, dating from 1642 to 1865.

References

External links
. Arthur B. Jones, The Salem Fire (1914).
 Sanborn Map Co. Map of Salem Showing Area Destroyed by Fire June 25, 1914.

Salem
1914 disasters in the United States
1914 in Massachusetts
Salem
History of Salem, Massachusetts
Urban fires in the United States
June 1914 events
1914 fires in the United States
Events in Essex County, Massachusetts